Naureen Farooq Ibrahim  is a Pakistani politician who has been a member of the National Assembly of Pakistan since August 2018.

Education
She has a degree of Bachelor of Arts (Hons).

Political career
She was elected to the National Assembly of Pakistan as a candidate of Pakistan Tehreek-e-Insaf (PTI) on a reserved seat for women from Khyber Pakhtunkhwa in the 2018 Pakistani general election.

Resignation

In April 2022, she also resigned from the National Assembly seat along with all Tehreek-e-Insaaf members after the Foreign-imposed Regime Change by the United States.

External Link

More Reading
 List of members of the 15th National Assembly of Pakistan
 List of Pakistan Tehreek-e-Insaf elected members (2013–2018)
 No-confidence motion against Imran Khan

References

Living people
Pakistan Tehreek-e-Insaf MNAs
Politicians from Khyber Pakhtunkhwa
Pakistani MNAs 2018–2023
Year of birth missing (living people)